SNTE can refer to:

 The chemical compound tin telluride (SnTe)
 Société Nouvelle d'Exploitation de la Tour Eiffel"
 The Sindicato Nacional de Trabajadores de la Educación of Mexico